Calvin Peete (July 18, 1943 – April 29, 2015) was an American professional golfer. He was the most successful African-American to have played on the PGA Tour, with 12 wins, prior to the emergence of Tiger Woods. Peete won the 1985 Tournament Players Championship and finished the season top-5 on the PGA Tour money list three times; 1982, 1983 and 1985. He was ranked in the top 10 players on the McCormack's World Golf Rankings in 1984.

Biography
Peete was born in Detroit. He played on the 1983 and 1985 U.S. Ryder Cup teams. He won the Vardon Trophy for lowest scoring average in 1984. He was in the top 10 of the Official World Golf Ranking for several weeks when they debuted in 1986.

Peete did not begin playing golf until he was in his 20s, but immediately excelled at a game most pros learn as young children. He learned the game while peddling goods to migrant workers in Rochester, New York, playing on the public course at Genesee Valley Park. Growing up poor, Peete suffered a badly broken arm that was never properly set. He was the leader in driving accuracy on the PGA Tour for 10 straight years, 1981–90. Peete was inducted into the African American Ethnic Sports Hall of Fame in 2002.

Peete died of lung cancer, in Atlanta, Georgia, on April 29, 2015.  He was 71.

Professional wins (14)

PGA Tour wins (12)

*Note: Tournament shortened to 54 holes due to weather.

PGA Tour playoff record (0–1)

Japan Golf Tour wins (2)

Results in major championships

Note: Peete never played in The Open Championship.

WD = withdrew
CUT = missed the half-way cut
"T" = tied

Summary

Most consecutive cuts made – 22 (1976 U.S. Open – 1987 Masters)
Longest streak of top-10s – 2 (1982 U.S. Open – 1982 PGA)

The Players Championship

Wins (1)

Results timeline

CUT = missed the halfway cut
WD = withdrew
"T" indicates a tie for a place.

U.S. national team appearances
Ryder Cup: 1983 (winners), 1985
Nissan Cup: 1985 (winners), 1986

See also 

 Spring 1975 PGA Tour Qualifying School graduates

References

External links
Calvin Peete Award

Calvin Peete Golf Companies

American male golfers
African-American golfers
PGA Tour golfers
PGA Tour Champions golfers
Ryder Cup competitors for the United States
Golfers from Detroit
Golfers from Florida
People from Ponte Vedra Beach, Florida
1943 births
2015 deaths
20th-century African-American sportspeople
21st-century African-American people